Abidnagar (Telugu:అబిద్ నగర్)  is a residential area located in Akkayyapalem, Visakhapatnam, India. It comes under Greater Visakhapatnam Municipal Corporation.

Transport
Akkayyapalem is well connected to Gajuwaka, NAD X Road, Maddilapalem and Pendurthi. APSRTC has buses with route numbers 48, 48A, 38 through the area's bus stop. Local auto rickshaws are also available.
APSRTC routes

References

Neighbourhoods in Visakhapatnam